Tagaytay, officially the City of Tagaytay, is a 2nd class component city in the province of Cavite, Philippines. According to the 2020 census, it has a population of 85,330 people.

It is one of the country's most popular destinations for domestic tourism because of its scenery and cooler climate provided by its altitude.  Tagaytay overlooks Taal Lake in Batangas and provides views of Taal Volcano Island in the middle of the lake through various vantage points situated in the city.

Etymology
Legend has it that the word Tagaytay came from "tagâ" meaning to cut and "itáy" which means father. A father and son were said to be on a wild boar hunt when the animal they were chasing turned and attacked them. As the boar charged towards the old man, the son cried "Tagâ, Itáy!". The boy's repeated shout reverberated in the alleys of the ridge. Heard by the residents, hunters and wood gatherers, the cries became subject of conversation for several days in the countryside. In time, the place where the shouts came from became known as Tagaytay. The most plausible origin is that city is named after the Tagalog word "tagaytay" which means ridge.

History

Philippine Revolution
During the Philippine revolution of 1896, the ridges and forests of Tagaytay became the sanctuary for revolutionaries including those from nearby provinces. The passage to and from towns via Tagaytay added the word "mananagaytay" to the native's vocabulary. It means "to traverse ridges."

World War II

On February 23, 1945, the 11th Airborne Division of Lt. Gen. Robert L. Eichelberger's 8th Army performed a combat jump of the 511th Parachute Infantry Regiment and associated elements on the ridge, with a drop zone around the Manila Hotel Annex, which had been cleared of Japanese forces by Filipino soldiers of the 4th, 42nd, 43rd, 45th and 46th Infantry Division of the Philippine Commonwealth Army, 4th Constabulary Regiment of the Philippine Constabulary and recognized guerillas. To commemorate this event, a marker was installed in 1951 at the junction of Silang, Canlubang-Nasugbu roads by the city officials in coordination with the National Historical Institute of the Philippines.

Cityhood

Tagaytay became a chartered city with the passing and signing of Commonwealth Act no. 338 by President Manuel L. Quezon on June 21, 1938, as authored by Rep. Justiniano Montano of Cavite. Like Trece Martires, it is a planned city, with segments created from the towns of Mendez, Indang, Silang and Amadeo.

Geography

Land area
It lies within 120° 56' longitude and 14° 6' latitude and overlooks Manila Bay to the North, Taal Volcano and Lake to the south and Laguna de Bay to the east.

Topography

The southern and eastern portions of Tagaytay are covered by hills and mountains which is generally forests, pine trees and open grasslands.

The ridge, which overlooks Taal Lake in Batangas province, is the edge of Taal Caldera. Tagaytay's built-up areas including the urban center is situated in the relatively level top of the caldera rim but beyond the edge are deep ravines that drop steeply to Taal Lake. The portions adjoining the municipalities of Mendez, Indang, Amadeo, Silang and Alfonso are level to nearly level areas interspersed with very gently sloping surface. Across the southern edge of the lake on the opposite side of the city is Mount Macolod, the highest point of the Taal Caldera rim.

Climate
Temperature and precipitation
Tagaytay has a mild tropical monsoon climate  (Köppen climate classification: Am) characterized by cooler weather compared to Manila, lower humidity and abundant rainfall. With its high elevation, the city gets foggy, windy, and cooler temperatures during the months of December, January and February. Like most areas in the province of Cavite, the city has two pronounced seasons: dry from November to April and wet during the rest of the year. This climate makes the city ideal for sports, picnics, conferences, honeymoons, country homes, and spiritual retreats.

Humidity and wind
Tagaytay has an average relative humidity of about 78%. Northeasterly winds prevail in the city from October to April. Winds come from southwest from May to September. The cool Tagaytay breeze has made the city popular for casual and competitive kite flying.

Barangays
Tagaytay is administratively subdivided into 34 barangays.

 Asisan 
 Bagong Tubig 
 Calabuso
 Dapdap East
 Dapdap West
 Francisco
 Guinhawa North
 Guinhawa South
 Iruhin East
 Iruhin South
 Iruhin West
 Kaybagal Central
 Kaybagal North
 Kaybagal South (Poblacion)
 Mag-Asawang Ilat
 Maharlika East
 Maharlika West
 Maitim 2nd Central
 Maitim 2nd East
 Maitim 2nd West
 Mendez Crossing East
 Mendez Crossing West
 Neogan
 Patutong Malaki North
 Patutong Malaki South
 Sambong
 San Jose
 Silang Junction North
 Silang Junction South
 Sungay East
 Sungay West
 Tolentino East
 Tolentino West
 Zambal

Demographics

In the 2010 census, Tagaytay had a population of 62,030 people. Christianity is the majority religion of Tagaytayeños with Roman Catholicism as the most dominant sect compromising of 95.36 percent of the total population. The next prominent Christian denominations among residents of Tagaytay are Protestants have of (3.37%) population including Iglesia ni Cristo have of (1.5%). The Eastern Orthodox Church was a part of the Philippine Orthodox Church here in the Philippines under the jurisdiction of the Patriarchate of Moscow and its own Orthodox Diocese province in Southeast Asia the Diocese of the Philippines and Vietnam, account of (1%) the Tagaytay's population many Orthodox community lives throughout the town. The rest of the population (0.20%) subscribes to other religions.

Tagalog is the most dominant language in the city with 93.58% of the population speaking the language. The next prominent Philippine languages are Bicolano (1.52%), Ilocano (1.52%), and Cebuano (1.00%).

Economy

Agriculture

Despite rapid urbanization of Tagaytay, agriculture remains an important part of the city's economy and development. The city was once a cogon land after it was discovered during the Taal eruption. The soil was proven to be with rich volcanic components suitable to farming with main agricultural goods produced are pineapple, coffee, banana, root crops, cacao, camote, cassava other fruits and vegetables, and cut flowers which are supplied to both local and international markets. Garden plant shops thrive the Tagaytay Calamba Road. The city was once an abundant Daisy and gladiola farming haven prior to tourism development and residential boom.

Tourism

Tagaytay is considered to be the second Summer capital of the Philippines with the first being Baguio due to its cool climate thus is a favored destination from those relatively more humid areas of the Philippines. Tagaytay is also a destination for tourists seeking views of Taal Volcano and the surrounding lake. In 2015, the Department of Tourism cited Tagaytay as the top tourist destination in the Calabarzon region. Among the most visited sites in Tagaytay are the SM Sky Ranch, Ayala Malls Serin, Robinsons Summit Ridge, Picnic Grove Complex, People's Park in the Sky, Halfway Zoo and different choices of restaurants known for serving the famous bulalo and crispy tawilis.  Fresh beef and vegetables are sold at Mahogany Market. The fruits stands are across the Tagaytay City Market where the fresh tilapia from Taal Lake are marketed. Tagaytay's proximity to Metro Manila is attributed to the tourism in the city. Tagaytay receives a seasonal influx of tourists during Christmas season and Holy Week, and the city is a pilgrimage destination with churches, shrines, and retreat houses. The Taal Vista Hotel is a symbol of Tagaytay's past.

Transportation

Roads

Tagaytay is linked by national highways to the Metro Manila area and to the provinces of Batangas and Laguna. Secondary roads link the city with the adjoining municipalities of Amadeo, Mendez, Indang, Silang and Alfonso in Cavite towards the northwest, and to the cities of Calamba and Santa Rosa in Laguna in the northeast and to the town of Talisay in Batangas in the south.

The South Luzon Expressway serves the city via Tagaytay–Santa Rosa Road that passes Santa Rosa and Silang from Santa Rosa and Eton City Exits, and Tagaytay-Calamba Road that passes Tagaytay Highlands and Calamba Premiere International Park from Batino Exit, albeit discontinuously for the public. Governor's Drive to Pala-pala Road from Carmona Exit is also another alternative route to the city that ends at Aguinaldo Highway in Dasmariñas. Manila-Cavite Expressway (CAVITEx or formerly, Coastal Road) also serves Tagaytay via the southbound Aguinaldo Highway. The Cavite–Tagaytay–Batangas Expressway (CTBEx) is a proposed expressway that will connect with the under-construction Cavite–Laguna Expressway (CALAEx) in Silang to Nasugbu, Batangas and will bypass but serve the city. CTBEx and CALAEx also connects with an interchange at Aguinaldo Highway in the future for easier travel of tourists coming from Metro Manila.

From Batangas, the main route to Tagaytay is either Tagaytay–Nasugbu Highway, a major thoroughfare from Tagaytay Rotonda to Nasugbu, Ligaya Drive, a winding road that starts near the poblacion of Talisay and ends near the Tagaytay Picnic Grove, or Tagaytay–Talisay Road, a  road from Lemery–Agoncillo–Laurel–Talisay Road to Tagaytay Rotunda. From Laguna, the main route is the Tagaytay–Santa Rosa Road from Santa Rosa, Laguna and another route is Tagaytay–Calamba Road (via Tagaytay Highlands) from Calamba Premiere International Park at Calamba, Laguna.

Notable people
 Francis Tolentino – Senator (2019–present), mayor of Tagaytay (1995–2004)

Sister cities

Local
 Legazpi
 Baguio
 Bacolod
 Murcia, Negros Occidental
 Iriga
 Palayan
 San Nicolas, Batangas
International
  Manningham, Victoria, Australia
  Las Vegas, Nevada
  Rohnert Park, California
  Tainan, Taiwan

See also
Tagaytay Hospital and Medical Center

References

External links

 
 Tagaytay Website
 [ Philippine Standard Geographic Code]

 
Cities in Cavite
Populated places established in 1938
1938 establishments in the Philippines
Mountain resorts in the Philippines
Component cities in the Philippines